Vanity of Duluoz: An Adventurous Education, 1935–46 is a 1968 semi-autobiographical novel by Jack Kerouac. The book describes the adventures of Kerouac's alter ego, Jack Duluoz, covering the period of his life between 1935 and 1946. The book includes reminiscences of the author's high school experiences in Lowell, Massachusetts, his education at Columbia University, and his subsequent naval service during World War II. It culminates with the beginnings of the beat movement. It was Kerouac's last work published during his life. The tone of the book has been noted for its stark contrast to On the Road.

Background
When Kerouac wrote Vanity of Duluoz in 1967 he had already been disenchanted and suffered alcoholism for several years, and his literary output had decreased. Typical of his memoir-style writing (but using a more structured grammar style he'd abandoned after his first novel The Town and the City), the book delves into his past in Lowell and New York, and narrates his various travels and other living situations. It revolves around the time of the pre-WWII and war years and his time in college and the merchant marines, and concludes with his life in the early renaissance of the Beat Generation. However, due to Kerouac's rambling style the book is frequently laced with comments on his contemporary world, his mid-life musings, and jabberwocky-like wordplay, and through certain portions of the book, he addresses the narration to "wifey".

Towards the end of the book, in Book 13, Kerouac identifies the meaning of his vanity with the words of King Solomon found in Ecclesiastes: "There is nothing new under the sun;" "All is vanity."

Character Key 
Kerouac often based his fictional characters on friends and family.

Notes

1968 American novels
Novels by Jack Kerouac
American autobiographical novels
Coward-McCann books
Novels set in Columbia University